Jeff Tiessen is a paralympic athlete from Canada competing mainly in category TS3 sprint events.

Biography
Tiessen competed in three Paralympics games across three sports and winning three medals.  His first games in 1984 he competed in swimming and athletics, in the swimming he competed in the A5 class in the 50m breaststroke, 100m freestyle and 150m individual medley, In athletics he competed in the A5 class 400m and won the silver medal in the high jump.  In 1988 concentrating on athletics this time he won a gold medal in the 400m A5A7 class race as well as competing in the 100m and 200m.  His final games brought his final medal a bronze in his only event, the 400m for TS3 class athletes. In 2010, Tiessen was inducted into the Canadian Disability Hall of Fame.

References

Paralympic swimmers of Canada
Paralympic track and field athletes of Canada
Swimmers at the 1984 Summer Paralympics
Athletes (track and field) at the 1984 Summer Paralympics
Athletes (track and field) at the 1988 Summer Paralympics
Athletes (track and field) at the 1992 Summer Paralympics
Paralympic gold medalists for Canada
Paralympic silver medalists for Canada
Paralympic bronze medalists for Canada
Living people
Medalists at the 1984 Summer Paralympics
Medalists at the 1988 Summer Paralympics
Year of birth missing (living people)
Paralympic medalists in athletics (track and field)
Canadian male sprinters
Canadian male high jumpers
Canadian male freestyle swimmers
Canadian male breaststroke swimmers
Canadian male medley swimmers
20th-century Canadian people
Sprinters with limb difference
High jumpers with limb difference
Paralympic sprinters
Paralympic high jumpers